Elke Hipler (born 19 September 1978 in Essen) is a German rower. She competed in the eight at the 2004 and 2008 Olympics.

References
 

1978 births
Living people
German female rowers
Sportspeople from Essen
Rowers at the 2004 Summer Olympics
Rowers at the 2008 Summer Olympics
Olympic rowers of Germany
World Rowing Championships medalists for Germany
20th-century German women
21st-century German women